Night Flyer or Night Flier may refer to:

 Night Flyer: The Singer Songwriter Collection, a compilation album by American guitarist Tony Rice
 The Night Flier, a 1988 horror short story by Stephen King
 The Night Flier (film), a 1997 horror film based on the story by Stephen King
 The Night Flyer (film), a 1928 American silent drama film

See also 
 Night Flight (disambiguation)
 Nightflyers